Holy Name Preparatory School is a public primary school located in Port of Spain, Trinidad and Tobago. Originally associated with Holy Name Convent secondary school and Sacred Heart Boys, the school became an independent entity in 1965.  It currently has around 600 students enrolled.

Address
The School sits at #2 Queen's Park East, Opposite Memorial Park, between Holy Name Convent and the Port of Spain General Hospital.

Administration
It is run by the Dominican Sisters.

Notable alumni
 Keith Sobion (Former T&T Attorney General & Minister of Legal Affairs)

External links
 Official Website

References

Buildings and structures in Port of Spain
Catholic schools in Trinidad and Tobago